The 1891 South Dorset by-election for the UK Parliament was held on 7 May 1891 after the death of the incumbent Conservative MP Charles J. T. Hambro.  The seat was retained by the Conservative candidate William Brymer.

Results

References 

By-elections to the Parliament of the United Kingdom in Dorset constituencies
May 1891 events
1891 elections in the United Kingdom
1891 in England
19th century in Dorset